Martenshoek (abbreviation: Mth) is an unstaffed railway station in Martenshoek in the Netherlands. The station opened on 1 Jan 1905 and is located on the Harlingen–Nieuweschans railway between Groningen and Nieuweschans. The services are operated by Arriva.

Location 
The railway station is located at the Spoorstraat in Martenshoek, part of the municipality of Midden-Groningen, in the province of Groningen in the northeast of the Netherlands. It is situated on the Harlingen-Nieuweschans railway between the railway stations of Kropswolde and Hoogezand-Sappemeer, both also in the municipality of Midden-Groningen.

History 
Train services started at Martenshoek on 1 Jan 1905. Initially, trains were operated by the Maatschappij tot Exploitatie van Staatsspoorwegen, until it merged with the Hollandsche IJzeren Spoorweg-Maatschappij to form the Nederlandse Spoorwegen in 1938. The station building was demolished and replaced by a shelter in 1970. The Nederlandse Spoorwegen operated the trains until 2000, when first NoordNed (2000–2005) and later Arriva (2005–present) received the concession for the northern railway lines of the Netherlands.

Layout 

At the station, there are two tracks and two platforms. Platform 1 is north of the tracks, serving trains towards Groningen, and platform 2 is south of the tracks, serving trains towards Bad Nieuweschans.

Train services

Bus services

References

External links
 
 Martenshoek station, station information

Buildings and structures demolished in 1970
Railway stations in Groningen (province)
Railway stations on the Staatslijn B
Transport in Midden-Groningen